Pygarctia eglenensis, the gray-winged pareuchaetes, is a moth in the family Erebidae. It was described by James Brackenridge Clemens in 1861. It is found in the US states of Texas and Florida.

Larvae have been recorded feeding on Asclepias species.

References

Arctiidae genus list at Butterflies and Moths of the World of the Natural History Museum

Moths described in 1861
Phaegopterina